Tribromoisocyanuric acid (C3Br3N3O3) is a chemical compound used as a reagent for bromination in organic synthesis.  It is a white crystalline powder with a strong bromine odour.  It is similar to trichloroisocyanuric acid.

Uses
Tribromoisocyanuric acid is used for the bromination of aromatics and alkenes.

References

Organobromides
Reagents for organic chemistry
Ureas
Triazines